Players and pairs who neither have high enough rankings nor receive wild cards may participate in a qualifying tournament held one week before the annual Wimbledon Tennis Championships.

The qualifying rounds for the 2000 Wimbledon Championships were played from 20 to 23 June 2000 at the Bank of England Ground in Roehampton, England, United Kingdom.

Seeds

  Jennifer Hopkins /  Petra Rampre (qualifying competition, lucky losers)
  Caroline Dhenin /  Renata Kolbovic (qualifying competition, lucky losers)
  Angelika Bachmann /  Eva Dyrberg (qualified)
  Evie Dominikovic /  Amanda Grahame (first round)

Qualifiers

  Shinobu Asagoe /  Samantha Reeves
  Angelika Bachmann /  Eva Dyrberg
  Helen Crook /  Victoria Davies
  Selima Sfar /  Jasmin Wöhr

Lucky losers

  Jennifer Hopkins /  Petra Rampre
  Caroline Dhenin /  Renata Kolbovic

Qualifying draw

First qualifier

Second qualifier

Third qualifier

Fourth qualifier

External links

2000 Wimbledon Championships on WTAtennis.com
2000 Wimbledon Championships – Women's draws and results at the International Tennis Federation

Women's Doubles Qualifying
Wimbledon Championship by year – Women's doubles qualifying
Wimbledon Championships